Jodhpur is the second-largest city in the Indian state of Rajasthan and officially the second metropolitan city of the state. It was formerly the seat of the princely state of Jodhpur State. Jodhpur was historically the capital of the Kingdom of Marwar, which is now part of Rajasthan. Jodhpur is a popular tourist destination, featuring many palaces, forts, and temples, set in the stark landscape of the Thar Desert. It is popularly known as the "Blue City" among people of Rajasthan and all over India. It serves as the administrative headquarters of the Jodhpur district and Jodhpur division.

The old city circles the Mehrangarh Fort and is bounded by a wall with several gates. The city has expanded greatly outside the wall, though over the past several decades. Jodhpur lies near the geographic centre of the Rajasthan state, which makes it a convenient base for travel in a region much frequented by tourists. The city featured in The New York Timess "52 Places to Go in 2020".

The city is also home to several educational institutions, the most prominent being All India Institute of Medical Sciences, Jodhpur, Indian Institute of Technology Jodhpur, Dr. Sampurnanand Medical College, DSRRAU Jodhpur, and National Law University, Jodhpur, and many research institutes, such as Indian Space Research Organisation, Defence Research and Development Organisation, Central Arid Zone Research Institute, Arid Forest Research Institute, and Desert Medicine Research Centre are also located in the city.

 History 

 Early history 
The Jodhpur city was founded in 1459 by Rao Jodha, a Rajput chief of the Rathore clan. Jodha succeeded in conquering the surrounding territory and thus founded a kingdom which came to be known as Marwar. As Jodha hailed from the nearby town of Mandore, that town initially served as the capital of this state; however, Jodhpur soon took over that role, even during the lifetime of Jodha. The city was located on the strategic road linking Delhi to Gujarat. This enabled it to profit from a flourishing trade in opium, copper, silk, sandalwood, dates, and other tradeable goods.

 Early modern period 
After the death of Rao Chandrasen Rathore in 1581, the kingdom annexed by the Mughal Emperor Akbar, Marwar thus became a Mughal vassal owing fealty to them while enjoying internal autonomy. Jodhpur and its people benefited from this exposure to the wider world as new styles of art and architecture made their appearance and opportunities opened up for local tradesmen to make their mark across northern India.

Aurangzeb briefly sequestrated the state (circa 1679) after the death of Maharaja Jaswant Singh, but the prior ruler Maharaja Ajit Singh was restored to the throne by Veer Durgadas Rathore after Aurangzeb died in 1707 and a great struggle of 30 years. The Mughal empire declined gradually after 1707, but the Jodhpur court was beset by intrigue; rather than benefiting from circumstances, Marwar descended into strife and invited the intervention of the Marathas, who soon supplanted the Mughals as overlords of the region. 
In 1755 Jai Appa Sindhia attacked on Nagaur after looted several places of Rajasthan. Jai Appa halted his army near samas pond of Tausar which was 3.5 Km from Nagaur fort. He surrounded Nagaur fort and cut off food and water supply. Maharaja Vijay Singh ji called Darbar and asked volunteer to kill Scindia. Gaji Khan Khokhar (Chawata Kallan) and Kan Singh (Dotalai) were volunteered and taken responsibility to kill Jaiappa ji Scindia. Both changed their outfit as trader's and open shop near Jaiappa ji army. They observed their activities for two month. On 25 Jul 1755 on Friday at 11 am ,when found opportunity attacked on Jaiappa with daggers and killed him(Painting situated in Mandore musium). While fighting both the loyal Soldier of Jodhpur Martyred. From than a common proverb still people say "Khokhar bada khuraki kha gaya appa jaisa daaki"( Khokhar are great gormandiser,eaten demon like appa).Even after killing of Jai Appa Sindhia Maratha army continued fighting for few month near Nagaur but they lost hope after Jai Appa death.This did not make for stability or peace, however; 50 years of wars and treaties.

Dissipated the wealth of the state, which sought the help of the British and entered into a subsidiary alliance with them. A major revolt occurred in 1857 by some Rathore nobles of Pali led by Thakur Kushal Singh of Auwa, but the rebels were defeated by the British Army under Colonel Holmes and peace was restored.Political Awakening and Indian Freedom Movement with Special Reference to Rajasthan pg 28-35

 British colonial period 

During the British Raj, the state of Jodhpur had the largest land area of any in the Rajputana. The land area of the state was  its population in 1901 was 44,73,759. It enjoyed an estimated revenue of £3,529,000. Its merchants, the Marwaris, flourished and came to occupy a position of dominance in trade across India.

 After independence 
In 1947, when India became independent, the state merged into the union and Jodhpur became the second-largest city of Rajasthan. At the time of division, the ruler of Jodhpur, Hanwant Singh, did not want to join India, but finally, due to the effective persuasion of Vallabhbhai Patel at the time, the state of Jodhpur was included in the Indian Republic. Later after the State Reorganisation Act, 1956, it was included within the state of Rajasthan.

 Demographics 

As per provisional reports of Census India, Jodhpur had a population of 1,033,918 in 2011, consisting of approximately 52.62% males and approximately 47.38% females. The average literacy rate is 80.56 percent, approximately 88.42 percent for males and 73.93 percent for females. Approximately 12.24 percent of the population is under six years of age. Jodhpur city is governed by a Municipal Corporation which comes under Jodhpur Urban Agglomeration. The Jodhpur Urban/Metropolitan area includes Jodhpur, Kuri Bhagtasani, Mandore Industrial Area, Nandri, Pal Village and Sangariya. Its urban/metropolitan population is 1,137,815 of which 599,332 are males and 538,483 are females. With the inclusion of 395 villages in Jodhpur city in the month of February 2021 by JoDA, the new population count for the city is 2,330,000 and is expected to grow by 33.04% over the next decade. In the year 2031 population of Jodhpur city is expected to be more than 3.1 million. The population of Jodhpur city after expansion of city borders is 2,330,000.

 Geography and climate 

Jodhpur has a hot arid climate (Köppen BWh), just short of a hot semi-arid climate (Köppen BSh) due to its very high potential evapotranspiration. Jojari river, a tributary of Luni River, flows from Banad to Salawas in Jodhpur Urban Area. A Riverfront project is approved and is in Planning for this river for 35 km length coming inside Jodhpur Urban Area which is under Nammi Ganga Project of Ministry of Jal Shakti from January 2021, earlier this project was under Jodhpur Development Authority. Pin Code of Jodhpur is 342001 which comes under Jodhpur postal division (Jodhpur Region).

Temperatures are extreme from March to October, except when the monsoonal rain produces thick clouds to lower it slightly. In April, May, and June, high temperatures routinely exceed 40 °C. During the monsoon season, average temperatures decrease slightly, but the city's generally low humidity rises, which adds to the perception of the heat.

 Economy 

Jodhpur's contributes $4 billion (approx) to Rajasthan's economy through different Industries. Jodhpur is the Handicraft Hub of India of $200 million industry. Tourism comes next where Jodhpur is one of the most popular tourist destination through many portals with top heritage hotels of India.

Jodhpur also has the largest Education Industry in western Rajasthan with top Coaching institutes of IIT-JEE, NEET and Civil Service Exams.

The upcoming 9 MMTPA Refinery and Petrochemical complex to be set up by Hindustan Petroleum Corporation Limited (HPCL) in Pachpadra, Barmer district will transform the industrial scene of the city drastically. Pachpadra lies just 60 kilometres from the industrial area of Boranada in Jodhpur. Around 120 by-products that are produced by the refinery are going to provide huge opportunities for new industries to be set up in and around Jodhpur.

India's most ambitious industrial development project, the over US$100 billion Delhi-Mumbai Industrial Corridor Project is also going to impact the industrial scenario in Jodhpur in a big way. Marwar Junction which is located about 100 kilometres from Jodhpur will be one of the nine freight loading points along the DMIC route. Jodhpur and Pali districts fall under the region that is going to be developed as a manufacturing hub for the DMIC.

 Elected representatives 
The present Member of Parliament from Jodhpur is Gajendra Singh Shekhawat of the BJP.

 Strategic location 
Jodhpur is a significant city of western Rajasthan and lies about 250 km from the border with Pakistan. This location makes it a key base for the Indian Army, Indian Air Force (IAF), and Border Security Force. Jodhpur's South Western Air Command is one of Asia's largest and one of the most critical and strategically located airbases of the IAF (The Jodhpur Airport played the crucial role during the Indo-Pakistani wars of 1965 and 1971) deployed fighter jets and advanced light helicopters. There are 5 squadrons of Indian Air force which known as 32 wing.

 Culture 
Jodhpur has culturally been known by the name of Jodhana by the locals. The city is famous for its food and its popularity can be judged by the fact that one can find sweet shops named "Jodhpur Sweets" in many cities throughout India. Being at the onshore of Thar Desert, life has been influenced by ways of select nomadic tribes (so-called "gypsy" groups – Banjara in Hindi – have settled in some parts of the city). Jodhpur has distinct cultural identity through its food and is famous for its Mirchi Bada, Rabdi Ghewar and Mawa Kachori.

 Tourism 
Jodhpur's most notable attractions are Mehrangarh Fort which overlooks upon the city, the blue bylanes of the old city are also an attraction, Umaid Bhawan Palace, Jaswant Thada, and the Ghanta Ghar, or Clock Tower. Tourists are also within proximity to Mandore Garden, Kaylana Lake and Garden, Balsamand Lake, Machia Biological Park, Rao Jodha Desert Rock Park, Ratanada Ganesh Temple, Toorji Ka Jhalra, Sardar Samand Lake and Palace, Masooria Hills, Veer Durgadas Smarak (monument, park, and museum), Surpura Dam and Bhim Bhadak Cave. Other attractions of people are at markets of food, antique items, traditional clothes and traditional shoes (also called Jodhpuri Mojari) held in Jodhpur. Mahamandira, a temple consecrated to Sri Jalandharnath, is known for its murals showing ascetics in yoga poses and murals bearing inscriptional records of the dignitaries visiting the shrine which includes Charanas, nobles, and the Rajas.

Motion-picture industry
The city is famous for its charming locations and is often featured in various films, advertisements, music videos, and soaps. The historic buildings and landscapes of the city were featured in a number of movies, including The Dark Knight Rises directed by Christopher Nolan; Baadshaho starring Ajay Devgn and Emraan Hashmi, The Darjeeling Limited starring Owen Wilson, Adrien Brody, and Jason Schwartzman; The Fall directed by Tarsem Singh; Hum Saath-Saath Hain directed by Sooraj Barjatya; Veer directed by Anil Sharma; Shuddh Desi Romance directed by Maneesh Sharma; I directed by S. Shankar, Kung Fu Yoga starring Jackie Chan, Sonu Sood, and Disha Patani; Loafer starring Varun Tej and Disha Patani; Supreme starring Sai Dharam Tej and Rashi Khanna; and Airlift featuring Akshay Kumar and Nimrat Kaur. Many foreign-language films and series have also been shot in Jodhpur, such as Buddies in India, which was produced in Mandarin and was launched in China in 2017 featuring some Indian actors, and even the songs were in Hindi.

 Cuisine 

A number of dishes from Indian cuisine originated in Jodhpur. The city savours a number of food items, but the specialties of the city are Pyaaj Kachori, Mirchi Bada and Mawa Kachori. 
Dal-Baati-Churma, Makhaniya Lassi, Ker Sangri are also some famous foods in Jodhpur.

 Education and research 

Educational facilities include:
 Indian Institute of Technology Jodhpur  is a technical education institute in India, one of the new Indian Institutes of Technology (IIT). 
 All India Institute of Medical Sciences Jodhpur
 National Law University, Jodhpur,  is one of the 17 universities imparting law education (established in 1999).
 National Institute of Fashion Technology Jodhpur is a fashion-design institute (started in 2010).
 Dr. Sarvepalli Radhakrishnan Rajasthan Ayurved University is a university in the field of Ayurveda. The second university of its kind in India, it was started in 2003.
 Jai Narain Vyas University (JNVU), formerly known as University of Jodhpur, is run by the state government of Rajasthan (established in 1962).
 Dr. S.N. Medical College, Jodhpur (established in 1965).
 MBM Engineering College: the oldest engineering institution in Rajasthan, it is now a faculty of engineering and architecture, under JNVU (established in 1951).
 Footwear Design and Development Institute Jodhpur is an institute established by the government of India, Ministry of Commerce and Industry for the design and development of footwear, fashion, and leather (started in 2012).
 Indian Institute of Handloom Technology  is one of the five institutes nationwide to provide research, development, and technical education to the handloom industry.
 Sardar Patel University of Police, Security and Criminal Justice, started in 2013, is a university for research and education in the field of security, policing, and criminal justice.Krishi Vishwavidyalaya, Jodhpur, started in 2013 is an Agricultural University for research, education and extension in the field of Agricultural Sciences & Technology for farmer of Marwar Region.

 Research 
Major research institutes and organizations have been established in the city for promoting research:
 Arid Forest Research Institute is one of the institutes of the Indian Council of Forestry Research and Education  working under the Ministry of Environment and Forests,  for carrying out scientific research in forestry to provide technologies to increase the vegetative cover and to conserve the biodiversity in the hot arid and semiarid region of Rajasthan, Gujarat, and Dadara union, and Nagar Haveli union territory. The campus covers 66 hectares on the New Pali Road.
 Central Arid Zone Research Institute  is a premier organisation of the Indian Council of Agricultural Research, an autonomous organization under the Department of Agricultural Research and Education, Ministry of Agriculture, government of India.
 National Institute for Implementation Research on Non-Communicable Diseases  is one of the 33 permanent institutes of Indian Council of Medical Research, which is an autonomous body for the formulation, coordination, and promotion of biomedical research in the country.
 Desert Regional Centre, Zoological Survey of India  is the regional arm of the only taxonomic organization in the country involved in the study of all kinds of animals to promote survey, exploration, and research leading to the advancement of zoological study.
 Botanical Survey of India is the nodal research organization under Ministry of Environment and Forests for research, exploration, and survey of the flora of India.
 Defence Research and Development Organisation is an organization working under the Department of Defence Research and Development of Ministry of Defence for design and development leading to the production of world-class weapons systems and equipment.
 Regional Remote Sensing Centre  is one of the five centres established under National Natural Resources Management System  by Department of Space for remote sensing tasks at regional and national levels.
 MBM Engineering College conducts research and has masters and PhD programs in branches of engineering by highly experienced faculty. In civil and chemical engineering, national and state projects are performed by this college.

 Judiciary 

Rajasthan High Court is the High Court of the state of Rajasthan. It was established on 21 June 1949 under the Rajasthan High Court Ordinance, 1949.

The High Court of Rajasthan was founded in 1949 in Jodhpur and was inaugurated by the Rajpramukh, Maharaja Sawai Man Singh on 29 August 1949. The first Chief Justice was Kamala Kant Verma and the current Chief Justice of the Rajasthan High Court is the Honorable Justice Indrajit mohanty. A bench was formed at Jaipur which was dissolved in 1958 and was again formed on 31 January 1977. Currently, there are forty sanctioned judges.

Civic administration

Till 2020, the city was administered by a single municipal body, Jodhpur Nagar Nigam with a mayor. In 2019, the Rajasthan government  decided to form two municipal corporation in Jaipur, Jodhpur and Kota for better administration. For administrative purposes, the city is divided into wards, from which the members of the corporation council are elected for five years. The municipal corporation has elected members known as councilors, or parshad in Hindi, representing their respective wards (geographical units of the city). The ward members are elected by direct voting by electorate for a period of 5 years. In addition to these directly elected members, the corporation has four ex-officio members (one member of parliament, three members of legislative assembly, namely Sardarpura, Soorsagar, City), and three nominated members. Currently, the city has two civic bodies – Jodhpur North and Jodhpur South each headed by a mayor. Each municipal corporation has 80 wards, making a total of 160 wards in the city. The Jodhpur Development Authority (JDA) executes and supervises plans and schemes for the development of the urban region.

 Transportation 
The city has well-established rail, road, and air networks connecting it to other major cities of the country.

 Railways 

For experiencing the true magnificence and royal opulence of Rajasthan, luxury trains Palace on Wheels, Royal Rajasthan on Wheels, and Maharaja Express are run jointly by Rajasthan Tourism Development Corporation and Indian Railways. Jodhpur is one of the destinations of both of the trains.

In 2012-13 Railway Budget,A plan for building a High Speed Rail Corridor between Delhi-Jodhpur via Jaipur and Ajmer of 591 km was introduced which later in 2020 was included in HSR by Indian Railways and Government of India and now is in Pre-Feasibility phase.

In 2013, a plan to start metro train service in Jodhpur was proposed by then Rajasthan Government to decongest the city traffic. However, this proposal is still pending with the state government for its approval. 
But in 2021, Jodhpur Development Authority and Municipal Corporations made a Future Mobility Plan where a 35-km Metro Line is proposed from IIT Jodhpur to Jaisalmer Bypass after Year 2030. With another proposed 11 more BRTS Corridors in Jodhpur between 2021–2030 to provide public transport to the increasing population before starting Metro.

Suburban stations around Jodhpur:

 Air 

Jodhpur Airport is one of the prominent airports of Rajasthan. It is primarily a military airbase with a civilian enclosure to allow for civilian air traffic. Due to Jodhpur's strategic location, this airport is regarded as one of the most important ones for the Indian Air Force.

At present,  direct flights from Ahmedabad, Belgaum, Bengaluru, Chennai, Delhi, Hyderabad, Indore, Kolkata and Mumbai to the city are operated by Air India Indigo, SpiceJet, Vistara and Star Air. The bill and basic formalities for the long-awaited expansion of the airport were cleared by all the concerned authorities in June 2016, clearing the way for the expansion of the airport in two phases beginning February 2016. After the expansion, morning and evening flights are expected from the city to more cities than presently available, in addition to more airlines coming to and from the city.

 Road 
Jodhpur is connected by road to all major cities in Rajasthan and neighboring states, such as Delhi, Ahmedabad, Surat, Ujjain, and Agra. Apart from deluxe and express bus services to cities within the state, Rajasthan Roadways provides Volvo and Mercedes Benz bus service to Delhi, Ahmedabad, Jaipur, Udaipur, and Jaisalmer. In 2016, Bus Rapid Transit System Jodhpur was launched in the city with low-floor and semi-low-floor buses plying on 6 major routes.
Jodhpur is connected to the National Highway network with three national highways and to the Rajasthan State Highway network with 10 state highways.Jodhpur Ring Road is under construction encircling Jodhpur to reduce vehicular traffic.

National highways passing through Jodhpur include:
 NH-62, Ambala-Kaithal-Hissar-Fatehpur-Jodhpur-Pali; total length = 690 km
 NH-112, Junction with NH-14 near Bar connecting Jaitaran-Bilara-Kaparda-Jodhpur-Kalyanpur-Pachpadra-Balotra-Tilwara-Kher-Bagundi-Dhudhwa-Madhasar-Kawas and terminating at its junction with NH 15 near Barmer; total length= 343 km 
 NH-114, Junction with NH-65 near Jodhpur connecting Balesar - Dechhu and terminating at its junction with NH-15 near Pokaran; total length= 180 km

State highways passing through Jodhpur are:
 SH-19, Phalodi (NH 15) to Needar via Ahu, Chadi, Pachudi, Nagaur, Tarneu, Khatu Kalan, Khatu khurd, Toshina, Kuchaman City, Bhuni, Maroth, Deoli Minda, Renwal Crossing, Kaladera; total length = 368 km
 SH-21, Dantiweara to Merta City via Pipar City, Borunda; total length = 97 km
 SH-28, Phalodi (NH 15) to Ramji ki Gol via Deeechu, Shergarh, Pachpadra, Balotra, Sindri, Guda Malani; total length = 259 km
 SH-58, Jodhpur to Bheem up to NH 8 via Vinakiya, Rajola Sojat, Rendiri, Bhaisana, Sojat Road, Kantalia, Baban; total length = 142 km
 SH-61, Phalodi (NH 15) to Mandal via Osian, Mathania, Jodhpur, Khejrali, Bhatenda, Saradasamand, Jadan, Marwar Junction, Auwa, Jojawar, Kamalighat, Devgarh, Rajaji ka kareda; total length = 349 km
 SH-62, Bilara to Pindwara via Sojat, Sireeyari, Jojawar, Bagol, Desuri, Sadri, Sewari; total length = 187 km
 SH-63, Banar to Kuchera via Bhopalgarh Asop; total length = 129 km
 SH-65, Sheo (NH 15) to Shergarh via Bhiyad, Barnawa Jagger, Patodi, Phalsoond; total length = 155 km
 SH-66, Siwana to Dhandhaniya (NH 114) via Samdari, Kalyanpur, Mandli Rodhawa Kalan; total length = 90 km
 SH-68, Dangiyawas (NH 112) to Balotra via Kakelao, Khejarli, Guda Kakani, Luni, Dhundhara, Rampura, Samdari; total length = 131 km

BusPaota Bus Stand is a most important bus stand for all the government and private buses for Jodhpur route which is operated by RSRTC. This Bus stand serves to various rural and urban areas. This is a biggest Bus stand in Jodhpur.

Sports
Jodhpur has two outdoor stadiums and one indoor stadium complex. Barkatullah Khan Stadium has hosted two cricket one day internationals. Maharaja Umaid Singh Stadium and Gaushala Maidan Sports Complex are also among other sports facilities.
The city has a well developed polo ground where tournaments are held occasionally.

Media
Newspapers
Hindi newspapers
 Rajasthan Patrika
 Dainik Bhaskar
 Dainik Navjyoti
Dainik Jalte Deep

English newspapers
The Times of India
The Hindustan Times
The Indian Express

Radio
Jodhpur has these FM stations:
 Big FM
 Red FM
 My FM
 Vividh Bharti
 Radio Mirchi
 All India Radio

Notable people

 Maharaja Gaj Singh
 Justice Kan Singh Parihar
 Ashok Gehlot
 Justice Dalveer Bhandari
 Chitrangada Singh
 Donald Field
 Gajendra Singh Shekhawat
 Shailesh Lodha
 Kiku Sharda
 Ravi Bishnoi
 Mithali Raj
 Brij Bhushan Kabra
 Ustad Sultan Khan
 Karanvir Bohra
 Thakur Bakhtawar Singh (also known as IG Bakhtawar Singhji)

 See also 
 Auwa
 Arid Forest Research Institute (AFRI) Jodhpur
 Dhinga Gavar
 Lordi Daijagra
 Mandore
Tehsils of Jodhpur:

 Phalodi

 References 

 Further reading 
 Jodhpur, Published by [s.l.], 1933.
 Maharaja of Marwar 1973.
 Marwar under Jaswant Singh, (1658–1678): Jodhpur hukumat ri bahi, by Satish Chandra, Raghubir Sinh, Ghanshyam Dattan Singh of Jodhpur and His Times (1803–1843 A.D.), by padmaja Sharma. Published by Shiva Lal Agarwala, 1972.
 The Administration of Jodhpur State, 1800–1947 A.D., by Nirmala M. Upadhyaya. International Publishers, Sharma. Published by Meenakshi Prakashan, 1976.
 The History of Rajputana-Vol.IV, PartII. The History of the Jodhpur State, Part II, Veer Durgadas. 1941, Dr. Gaurishankar Hirachand Ojha.
 Jodhpur, Bikaner, Jaisalmer: Desert Kingdoms, by Kishore Singh, Karoki Lewis. Lustre Press Ltd. 1992.
 The House of Marwar: The Story of Jodhpur, by Dhananajaya Singh. Lotus Collection, Roli Books, 1994. .
 Modern Indian Kingship: Tradition, Legitimacy & Power in Jodhpur, by Marzia Balzani. Published by James Currey Limited, 2003. .
  Rathod Durgadas by Pt. Bishweshharnath Reu, 1948, Archaeological Department, Jodhpur.
  Veer Durgadas Rathor by Dr. L. S. Rathore, Thar Bliss Publisher, Jodhpur, 1987.
 Jodhpur and the Later Mughals, AD 1707–1752, by R. S. Sangwan. Published by Pragati Publications, 2006.
 Jaysom Uppadhyay (1650/1980), Mantri Karam Chand Vanshavali Prabandh (Hindi), Bhartiya Vidhya Bhawan (under Singhi Jain Granthmala series), Mumbai.
 Pandit Gaurishankar Hirachand Ojha ('''1999–2006). Udaipur Rajya ka Itihasa (History: Kingdom of Udaipur). Publisher: Rajasthani Granthaghar, Jodhpur.
 Pratap Singh Mehta (2016). Rajputana Chronicles: Guns and Glories – The thousand-year story of the Bachhawat clan, Notion Press Media, Chennai. 

 External links 

 Official website
 Jodhpur'' at Rajasthan Tourism Website

 
Metropolitan cities in India
Former capital cities in India